Weibel may refer to:
 office of "usher" in Switzerland, see Huissier
a surname
 Charles Weibel (born 1950) - American mathematician
 Weibel (sport shooter) - Swiss Olympic sports shooter
 Peter Weibel (1944–2023) - Austrian artist
 Ewald Weibel - Swiss biologist
eponymy 
 Weibel Scientific - a Danish designer and manufacturer of doppler radars
 Weibel–Palade body - storage granules of the endothelial cells, that form the inner lining of the blood vessels and heart
 Weibel Elementary School
 Weibel M/1932 - a light machine gun concept of Danish origin 
 Weibel instability - a plasma instability present in homogeneous or nearly homogeneous electromagnetic plasma